New Brighton Football Club (Rugby Union) are a rugby union team based in Moreton, Merseyside, UK. They currently play in the ADM Lancashire Championship League.

The club was formed in 1875 and have been based at several grounds over the years. The club's present home is Hartsfield, situated in Moreton, Wirral, England. One of the most notable matches in the club's history was when they hosted a joint New Brighton / North of Ireland F.C. team to face the 1969 touring South African team. The South Africa national team had initially intended to play an Ulster fixture in Belfast, but when this was cancelled and the New Brighton game scheduled in its place. The Springboks won 22–6. Today the club fields teams from many different age groups from 3 full senior men’s’ XVs, Womens’ XV, and under-18s sequentially down to under-5s

Notable players
James Patrick Quinn (New Brighton,  and British Lions) won his first cap for England against Wales on 16 January 1954 at Twickenham. He went on the 1955 British Lions tour to South Africa  playing twelve matches (including the last one against East Africa) scoring 21 points from three tries (9 points), three conversions (6 points) and two penalties (6 points).

Honours
Cheshire Cup winners (7): 1880, 1996, 1998, 1999, 2000, 2001, 2005
Cheshire Plate winners (2): 1983, 1992
North West 1 champions: 1993–94
North 2 champions: 1995–96
North 1 champions: 1997–98
South Lancs/Cheshire 1 champions: 2013–14

References

English rugby union teams
Rugby clubs established in 1875
Sport in the Metropolitan Borough of Wirral
New Brighton, Merseyside